Severus of Avranches was born to a poor peasant family in France. According to historian Georges Goyau, Severus was a sixth century shepherd, "...who was perhaps Bishop of Avranches"  

He was a shepherd in his youth. After joining the priesthood, he rose through the ranks of monk, priest and later abbot. He became bishop of Avranches. In his later years, he resigned his bishopric and returned to monastic life.

References

External links 
Catholic Forum: Severus of Avranches

Bishops of Avranches
7th-century Frankish bishops
7th-century Frankish saints